James Adam Belushi (born June 15, 1954) is an American actor, comedian and musician. He is best known for the role of Jim on the sitcom According to Jim (2001–2009). His other television roles include Saturday Night Live (1983–1985), Total Security (1997), and Twin Peaks (2017).

Belushi appeared in films such as Thief (1981), The Man with One Red Shoe (1985), Little Shop of Horrors (1986), Red Heat (1988), K-9 (1989), The Palermo Connection (1990), Destiny Turns on the Radio (1995), Angel's Dance (1999), The Wild (2006), The Ghost Writer (2010), Thunderstruck (2012), Home Sweet Hell (2015) and Wonder Wheel (2017).

He is the younger brother of late comic actor John Belushi and the father of actor Robert Belushi.

Early life 
Belushi was born June 15, 1954, in Wheaton, Illinois, to Adam Anastos Belushi (1918–1996), an Albanian from Qytezë, Korçë, and Agnes Demetri Belushi (née Samaras; 1922–1989), who was born in Ohio to Albanian immigrants from Korçë. He was raised in Wheaton, a Chicago suburb, along with his three siblings: older brother John (1949–1982), older sister Marian, and younger brother Billy. After graduating from Wheaton Central High School in 1972, Jim Belushi attended the College of DuPage, and graduated from Southern Illinois University Carbondale with a bachelor's degree in Speech and Theater Arts in 1978.

Career 

From 1977 to 1980, Belushi, like his older brother John Belushi, worked with the Chicago theater group The Second City. During this period, Belushi made his television debut in 1978's Who's Watching the Kids and also had a small part in Brian De Palma's The Fury. His first significant role was in Michael Mann's Thief (1981). After his elder brother John's death, from 1983 to 1985 he appeared on Saturday Night Live; he portrayed characters such as Hank Rippy from "Hello, Trudy!", Man on the Street Jesse Donnelly, and "That White Guy". Belushi also appeared in the film Trading Places as a drunk man in a gorilla suit during a New Year's Eve party. He made a guest appearance in Faerie Tale Theatre's third-season episode Pinocchio, starring Paul Reubens as the titular puppet.

Belushi rose to greater prominence with his supporting roles in The Man with One Red Shoe (1985), About Last Night..., Salvador and Little Shop of Horrors (as Patrick Martin) (all 1986), which opened up opportunities for lead roles. He has starred in films including Real Men, The Principal, Red Heat, Homer and Eddie, K-9, Abraxas, Guardian of the Universe, Dimenticare Palermo, Taking Care of Business, Mr. Destiny, Only the Lonely, Curly Sue, Once upon a Crime, Wild Palms, Race the Sun, Jingle All the Way, Separate Lives, Retroactive, Gang Related, Angel's Dance and Joe Somebody (2001).

His voice work includes The Mighty Ducks, The Pebble and the Penguin, Babes in Toy land, Gargoyles and Hey Arnold!, and Hoodwinked, Scooby-Doo! and the Goblin King and The Wild. He also lent his vocal talents for 9: The Last Resort (a PC game released in 1995), in which he portrayed "Salty", a coarse yet helpful character. In 1997, he portrayed the "Masked Mutant" in the Goosebumps PC video game, alongside Adam West as "The Galloping Gazelle". On January 4, 2001, Belushi appeared on the ER episode "Piece of Mind". The episode focused both on Dr. Mark Greene's life-or-death brain surgery in New York and on Belushi's character, who had been in a car accident with his son in Chicago. Belushi's performance contributed to his re-emergence in the public eye, and the following year he was cast as the title role in ABC's According to Jim.

His first animation voice-over was as a pimple on Krumm's head in Aaahh!!! Real Monsters on Nickelodeon. That performance led him to be cast in the recurring role as Simon the Monster Hunter in that series, where he ad-libbed much of his own dialogue.

In 2003, Belushi and Dan Aykroyd released the album Have Love, Will Travel, and participated in an accompanying tour. The concert was made available on video on demand by Bob Gold & Associates. He also performs at various venues nationwide as Zee Blues in an updated version of The Blues Brothers. He released his first book, Real Men Don't Apologize, in May 2006. Belushi was a narrator of an NFL offensive linemen commercial. Belushi also introduced the starting lineups for the University of Illinois football team during ABC's telecast of the 2008 Rose Bowl.

He appeared in MC Hammer's video "Too Legit to Quit" in 1991 (in the extended full-length version). He also hosted a celebration rally for the Chicago Cubs playoff series in Chicago prior to the 2008 World Series. Steve Dahl has dubbed him "The Funniest Living Belushi".

In 2010, Belushi was cast in a pilot for CBS called The Defenders, a series about defense lawyers. The one-hour series premiered on September 22, 2010. In two episodes in 2011, Belushi was paired with Blues Brothers partner Dan Aykroyd. On May 15, 2011, The Defenders was canceled by CBS. In 2011, he was cast as corrupt businessman Harry Brock in Born Yesterday, which opened on Broadway in late April.

In August 2020, Belushi started a Discovery Channel series about his life at his cannabis farm in Oregon, called Growing Belushi.

In August 2022, Belushi appeared as Brother Zee, with Aykroyd and The Blues Brothers Band, at the first Blues Brothers Con event held at Old Joliet Prison. The two day festival also featured a screening of the film and performances from  Mondo Cortez & The Chicago Blues Angels, Lil’ Ed & The Blues Imperials and Dave Weld & The Imperial Flames.

Personal life 
Belushi has been married three times. On May 17, 1980, he married Sandra Davenport, who gave birth to their son, Robert James, on October 23, 1980. Belushi and Davenport divorced in 1988. Belushi was married to actress Marjorie Bransfield from 1990 to 1992. He married Jennifer Sloan on May 2, 1998; the couple have a daughter and a son. On March 5, 2018, Jennifer Sloan filed for divorce from Belushi. The two have since reconciled.

Belushi is closely linked to his Albanian heritage and received honorary Albanian citizenship, as well as the "Honor of the Nation" Decoration from the President of Albania, Bamir Topi, in 2008. He is Eastern Orthodox Christian, visiting with the Ecumenical Patriarchate of Constantinople in 2010. Belushi is an avid fan of the Chicago Blackhawks, Chicago Bears, Chicago Cubs, Chicago Bulls and the Chicago Fire.

Belushi had a legal battle and publicized feud with his neighbor, actress Julie Newmar. She claimed their conflicts stemmed from Belushi's attempt to "build a second house in the back", which she claimed was illegal in their R-1 neighborhood, since there can be only one house per lot. In 2004, Belushi filed a $4million lawsuit against Newmar, alleging "she harassed and defamed him". He also claimed she destroyed his fence, which Newmar denied. They ended the feud in 2006, and Belushi invited Newmar to guest-star on According to Jim on an episode which satirized their conflict.

In 2011, Belushi announced he was suffering from gout, and became a spokesman for Savient Pharmaceuticals' educational campaign "Check Out Your Gout". He appeared on the cover of and was interviewed by Cigar Aficionado magazine.  Jim Belushi had such frequent diarrhea on the set of "According to Jim", castmates and crew started calling him "Jim Bel-loosey". He was later diagnosed with IBS, which he has since become an advocate for.

Belushi endorsed the re-election campaign of Democratic President Barack Obama in 2012. On a Fox News interview, he explained "When you talk to the President in private, he's a cool guy, who knows what he's doing. Besides, I'm from Chicago too."

Belushi built a getaway home in Eagle Point, Oregon in 2015 where he now grows cannabis. He is involved with fundraising for projects in Eagle Point and elsewhere in Southern Oregon, including the planned rebuilding of the Butte Creek Mill and the restoration of the Holly Theatre, in Medford. In 2018, he was living in Los Angeles "most of the time", The Oregonian reported, and living in Oregon part of the year. Per a 2018 article, Belushi indicated he planned on opening a pop-up cannabis dispensary in downtown Portland.

Filmography

Film

Television

Video games

References

External links 

 
 
 
 Jim Belushi interview with KVUE-TV in 1986 about About Last Night from Texas Archive of the Moving Image

1954 births
Living people
20th-century American comedians
20th-century American male actors
21st-century American comedians
21st-century American male actors
Actors from Wheaton, Illinois
American impressionists (entertainers)
American male comedians
American male film actors
American male television actors
American male voice actors
American people of Albanian descent
American sketch comedians
College of DuPage alumni
Disney people
Eastern Orthodox Christians from the United States
Male actors from Chicago
Male actors from Los Angeles
People from Brentwood, Los Angeles
People from Eagle Point, Oregon
People with acquired Albanian citizenship
Southern Illinois University Carbondale alumni
The Blues Brothers members